Rafiq Ahmad (1889–1982), commonly known as Comrade Rafiq Ahmad of Bhopal, was a communist activist of the 20th century in India. He was one of the founders of the Communist Party of India (Tashkent group) in Tashkent in 1920. After the independence of India he continued to live in Bhopal and later died in the same city. During this time after independence, he limited his political activities. Rafiq Ahmed went to Moscow to participate in Civil Wars and received the Lenin Award from the president of the Soviet Union. Later on, he received the Tampatrr Award from Indian Prime Minister Indira Gandhi. Rafiq Ahmed spoke Russian, Arabic, Hindi, English, and Urdu.

References

External links 
 https://books.google.com/books?id=Ek4dAAAAMAAJ&q=comrade+%22Rafiq+Ahmed%22&dq=comrade+%22Rafiq+Ahmed%22&client=firefox-a&pgis=1
 https://books.google.com/books?client=firefox-a&id=EV4eAAAAMAAJ&dq=comrade+%22Rafiq+Ahmed%22&q=%22Rafiq+Ahmed%22&pgis=1
 https://books.google.com/books?hl=en&lr=&id=I0Knt3WOIrQC&oi=fnd&pg=PA7&dq=Comrade+Rafiq+Ahmad+of+Bhopal&ots=30yM_LKBL7&sig=KKSiZezSOERRJ9F-h8hCmlgfEoY#v=onepage&q=rafiq&f=false

Communist Party of India politicians from Madhya Pradesh
Expatriates from British India in the Soviet Union
1889 births
1982 deaths